Belchier v Parsons (1754) 96 ER 908 is an English trusts law case, which stands as one of the earliest formulations of the prudent person rule.

Facts
Mr Holden had gone bankrupt, owing money to a range of creditors. Mrs Parsons was chosen as an assignee of the bankrupt estate, and she employed a broker, Mr Wigan, to sell off the assets (including a large quantity of tobacco) at public auction, and recover money for them. Mr Wigan did recover money, however fell sick and died ten days afterwards. It transpired that he was also bankrupt, and not enough to repay his own creditors. He had only paid over a small share of the proceeds from the tobacco sale to Mrs Parsons. The creditors of Mr Holden therefore sued Mrs Parsons, alleging that she should be liable for negligence in employing such a broker.

The Attorney General, Solicitor General, Mr Wilbraham speaking for Mrs Parsons pleaded that she should only be liable for the money that she had received, because Mr Wigan had been in good credit when he was employed, and so she had not been negligent. Nor was there any pretence of collusion or fraud. As the report read, he submitted,

Counsel for the creditors argued that Mrs Parsons nevertheless ought to have been deemed negligent, because it should have been usual practice for her to have collected the money from the auction at the latest a day or two after.

Judgment
Lord Hardwicke LC held that Mrs Parsons was not liable for the full sum of money, only the money that she had actually received, because she had acted in a way that a prudent man, managing his own affairs, would.

See also
English trusts law
UK bankruptcy law
UK insolvency law
Harvard College v Armory
Learoyd v Whiteley

Notes

References

English trusts case law
1754 in British law
Court of Chancery cases